Rudolf Canesius Soemolang Wowor  (13 December 1941 – 5 October 2018), better known as Rudy Wowor was a Dutch Indonesian dancer and actor of Indonesian cinema, often playing the role of Dutch antagonist. Wowor was of Indo descent and a citizen of Netherlands and Indonesia.

Biography
Son of a Dutch mother and a Manadonese father, he started his film career in the 1970s. Famous films he starred in include Virgin Dreams (1976), Aladdin (1980), Tjoet Nja' Dhien (1988), Soerabaia '45 (1990), Merah Putih (2009 film), and Java Heat (2013). He was nominated for Best Supporting Actor 1988 FFI for the film Tjoet Nja' Dhien.

Career
Aside from acting Wowor was also a dancer and choreographer. In 2007, Wowor became the permanent judge for the dance reality show titled Dance Celebrity Quiz.

Wowor had also written for Elle magazine and other periodicals. Having mastered seven languages, he also wrote in Spanish and Australian newspapers. Wowor died on 5 October 2018 from prostate cancer, aged 76.

Awards and nominations

References

External links
 
 Indonesian profile
 Online news article

1943 births
2018 deaths
Dutch male film actors
Male actors from Amsterdam
Indo people
Minahasa people
Dutch people of Indonesian descent
20th-century Dutch male writers
Dutch male dancers
Dutch choreographers
Dutch emigrants to Indonesia
Indonesian people of Dutch descent
Deaths from prostate cancer
Dutch male writers
20th-century Dutch male actors
21st-century Dutch male actors
Deaths from cancer in Indonesia